Bus transport in Warsaw was introduced in 1920. Since 1994, services have been managed by Zarząd Transportu Miejskiego w Warszawie (ZTM Warszawa), and operated by various companies under contract. ZTM's fleet consists of 1787 vehicles, which cover 288 lines.

In 1921, three lines were opened. From November 1939 the regular liquidation of the rolling stock began, only one car survived the war. Bus transport appeared again in April 1945. The first night bus appeared on the streets of Warsaw in 1963. On March 11, 1994, the Warsaw transport was reorganized.

In November 1994, the first German low-floor Neoplan N4020 was put into operation. 1999 was marked by modern and low-floor Solaris Urbino 15 buses. In 2002, MAN buses joined the Solarises.

Routes

Zone 1

Zone 2

Night lines

Local lines

Operators
 Miejskie Zakłady Autobusowe – owned by the city
 Depot R-1 „Woronicza”
 Depot R-2 „Kleszczowa”
 Depot R-3 „Ostrobramska”
 Depot R-4 „Stalowa”
 Depot R-5 „Redutowa”
 Arriva Bus Transport Polska – private company
 Europa Express City – private company
 Mobilis – private company
 KM Łomianki – private company
 Przedsiębiorstwo Komunikacji Samochodowej w Grodzisku Mazowieckim – private company

Tickets 

There is one ticket tariff for every mode of transportation. Tickets can be purchased at ticket machines all over the city and online.

Fleet

References

https://www.wtp.waw.pl/rozklady-jazdy/?wtp_dt=2020-04-21&wtp_md=3&wtp_ln=L-8

External links

 Route planner by WikiRoutes.info

Transport in Warsaw
Warsaw